The Hidden Kingdoms of China (previously reported as China's Hidden Kingdoms) is a television series and film, that  premiered on the National Geographic in February 2020. It is a exploration of China's animals and landscapes. The series is narrated by Michelle Yeoh. The series was also critiqued for not focusing enough on conservation.

References

External links

 The Hidden Kingdoms of China at National Geographic

2020 American television series debuts
National Geographic (American TV channel) original programming